Inspector is a 1956 Bollywood thriller film directed by Shakti Samanta. It starred Ashok Kumar, Geeta Bali and Pran.

Plot
Destiny moulds its own way. When Thakur Mahendra Singh adopted a child, his wife gave him the happy news that she is going to be a mother herself. The adopted son's father Badri, who was known as Thakur's faithful servant, thought of murdering the newly born child. But his wife Ganga stopped him and ran away with the child. Twenty-five years elapsed. But the sins of the father were not left unpunished. It was on the steps of Bijlis Kotha that a murder was committed. Rajkumar did not know how to dispose of the dead body. Badri, now a victoria driver, came to his rescue. He took away the dead body and placed it in a car parked at a lonely place. It was Varsha's car. A happy-go-lucky girl as she was, Varsha found the dead body. She was dumbfounded and thought to inform the police. But a second thought came to her mind and she pulled the dead body up to the road and left it there. A constable, who saw all this informed the Police. Inspector Shyam came to investigate and was surprised to see his own beloved entangled in this case. But the duty of a police officer came first, Varsha was arrested and the investigation went on. How was Varsha proved innocent? How were the criminals punished ? How did the Inspector solve the mystery? This is what you will see in INSPECTOR.

Cast
 Ashok Kumar as Shyam
 Geeta Bali as Varsha
 K. N. Singh as Badri Prasad
 Pran as Raj Kumar
 Mehmood as Banarasilal Paanwala
 Nazir Hussain as Thakur Mahendra Singh  
 Achala Sachdev as Ganga
 Pratima Devi as Mahendra Singh's Mother

Music
Music of this film is by Hemant Kumar, while the lyrics are by S. H. Bihari.

References

External links 
 

1956 films
1950s Hindi-language films
1956 crime films
Films directed by Shakti Samanta
Films scored by Hemant Kumar
1950s police films
Indian crime films
Hindi-language crime films
Indian black-and-white films